Kuébéni is a major river of southeastern New Caledonia. Kuebeni is also known as Kouebuni Riviere, Kouébuni Rivière, La Kuébéni River etc. The river has a catchment area of 38 square kilometres and is noted for its red clay and Pisolitic sandstone and nickel mining. It flows into the sea, north of Goro.

References

Rivers of New Caledonia